Mount Waterhouse may refer to:
Mount Waterhouse (Antarctica), in Oates Land
Mount Waterhouse, New Zealand, the second-highest peak in the Antipodes Islands